Man on the Moon often refers to:

 A crewed Moon landing
 Apollo 11 in 1969, the first crewed Moon landing

Man on the Moon may also refer to:

Books
 Man on the Moon (book), a 2002 children's book by Simon Bartram
 A Man on the Moon: The Voyages of the Apollo Astronauts, a 1994 nonfiction book by Andrew Chaikin

Film and TV
 Man on the Moon (film), a 1999 biopic of Andy Kaufman starring Jim Carrey 
 Man on the Moon, a 2015 advertisement for John Lewis department stores

Music

Albums
 Man on the Moon soundtrack
 Man on the Moon, an album trilogy by American musician Kid Cudi:
 Man on the Moon: The End of Day (2009, also acting as his debut studio album)
 Man on the Moon II: The Legend of Mr. Rager (2010)
 Man on the Moon III: The Chosen (2020)
 Man on the Moon, a 2021 album by N.Flying

Shows
 Man on the Moon (opera), a 2006 television opera by Jonathan Dove
 Man on the Moon (musical), a 1975 Broadway musical written by John Phillips of the Mamas and the Papas

Songs
 "Man on the Moon", a 1980 South African Music Charts Number 1 hit song by the South African Band Ballyhoo
 "Man on the Moon" (song), a 1992 song by R.E.M.
 "Man on the Moon (The Anthem)", a 2008 song by Kid Cudi from A Kid Named Cudi
 "Man on the Moon" (Alan Walker song), a 2021 song by Alan Walker
 "Man on the Moon", a 2012 song by Phillip Phillips from The World from the Side of the Moon
 The Man on the Moon, a spoken track by The Wiggles from the 1991 self-titled album

See also 
 "Man and the Moon", Wernher von Braun TV special
 Man in the Moon (disambiguation)
 Moon Man (disambiguation)